The 57th Santosh Trophy was played from 1 November 2001 till 17 November 2001 in Mumbai, Maharashtra.
The Santosh Trophy is an annual Indian football tournament which is contested by states and government institutions. The first winners were Bengal, who also lead the all-time winners list with 31 titles till date.
The 58th Santosh Trophy was held in Mumbai, Maharashtra. Thirty-two teams from all over the country, representing numerous states  intended to take part in the national state championships but six teams pulled out. At the final Kerala won 3–2, on a Golden Goal scored by Abdul Hakkim during extra time against Goa.

Qualifying rounds

Cluster I

 Meghalaya & Sikkim have pulled out

01-Nov-01: Services      11–0 Rajasthan [16,? Saroj Gurung, 19,?,? VK Mishra, 21,?,? Sajith Kumar, Amit Aich, Irudaya Raj, Semingthang]
03-Nov-01: Rajasthan      2–5 Services [R: 27 Dilip Singh, 81 Ashfaq Qureshi; S: 46 Amar Thapa, 48 Preetam Bahadur, 60 Irudaya Raj, 67,69 Sajith Kumar]

Cluster II

01-Nov-01: Manipur        7–0 Himachal Pradesh [16 F Stephen Hamar, 19,46,71 Nilakumar Singh, 29 Manglemjao Singh, 66 Tiken Singh, 70 Rohen Singh]
03-Nov-01: Haryana        7–1 Himachal Pradesh [H: 7 Virender Singh (own goal), 34,80 Manish Sharma, 20,38,61 Ranbir Singh, ? Sate Singh; HP: 42 Neeraj Kumar]
05-Nov-01: Manipur        3–0 Haryana [14 Mangalem Jao, 19 L Tiken Singh, 82 F Stephen Hamar]

Cluster III

 Mizoram & Nagaland have pulled out

04-Nov-01: Andhra Pradesh 0–4 Indian Railways [30 Partha Mitra, 39 Manjinder Singh, 51,57 Asif Jamal]
06-Nov-01: Andhra Pradesh 1–0 Indian Railways [45 Prakash Rao]

Cluster IV

02-Nov-01: Punjab         4–0 Tripura [10 Sukhjit Singh, 26 J Joseph, 66,89 Jaswinder Singh]
04-Nov-01: Uttar Pradesh  5–2 Tripura [U: 38,44,63 Afroz Ahmed, 87,91 Manmeet Singh; T: 25,? Kiran Chetri]
06-Nov-01: Uttar Pradesh  0–4 Punjab [24 Sukhjit Singh, 32,89 Gurjit Singh, 70 Hardip Singh Saini]

Cluster V

 Andaman&Nicobar Islands has pulled out

01-Nov-01: Madhya Pradesh 4–1 Pondicherry [M: Dharmendra Khare, 2xV Shibu, Rahamat Baig; P: S Newton]
03-Nov-01: Madhya Pradesh 0–2 Assam [64 Subir Goswami, 77 Birjab Moshahary]
05-Nov-01: Pondicherry    0–4 Assam [20 Tiaakum Ao, 32 Sandipan Chakravorty, 76 Pabitra Langsung, 85 Kamakhya Basumatary]

Cluster VI

01-Nov-01: Karnataka      7–1 Jammu&Kashmir [K: 6,43,63 Xavier Vijaykumar, 23 Sheikh Sanjib, 27 Dayanand, 45 Rajendra Prasad, 80 S Sunil; J: 48 Deepak Sagral]
03-Nov-01: Daman&Diu      1–5 Jammu&Kashmir [D: Dinesh Dhano; J: 14 Shabbir Ahmed, Irshad Ahmed, Deepak Sangram, Rajesh Kumar, Ijaz Ahmed]
05-Nov-01: Karnataka     10–0 Daman&Diu [11,45,61 S Sunil, 66 Sheikh Sanjib, 70,78,80 Gopi, Dayanand, Xavier Vijaykumar, 89 Saravana Lokesh]

Cluster VII

 Arunachal Pradesh has pulled out

02-Nov-01: Delhi          1–2 Orissa [D: 90 Ravinder Singh; O: 44 Saroj Kantha Patnaik, 50 Ranjit Kaudi]
04-Nov-01: Orissa         1–1 Chandigarh [O: 67 Saroj Kantha Patnaik; C: 5 Gurminder Singh]
06-Nov-01: Delhi          5–0 Chandigarh [?,54,61 Praveen Arora, 74 Manish Kumar, 90 Aziz Santra]

Cluster VIII

 Tamil Nadu move on by a toss of a coin

02-Nov-01: Tamil Nadu     1–1 Gujarat [T: 89 Syed Shabir Pasha: G: 67 Ranjit Sisodia]
04-Nov-01: Bihar          1–2 Gujarat [B: 10 Naveen Kumar; G: 1 Rajeev Karir, 59 Rajesh Tadvi]
06-Nov-01: Tamil Nadu     2–1 Bihar [T: 21 Kulothungan, 58 Mohammed Islam; B: 15 Naveen Kumar]

Quarterfinal League

Group A

07-Nov-01: Kerala         5–2 Assam [K: 2,89 Sylvester Ignatius, 20 Abdul Hakkim, 50,90 Asif Saheer; A: 60 Subir Goswami, 72 Tiakkum Ao]
09-Nov-01: Orissa         0–3 Assam [23 Tiaakum Ao, 37,53 Birjab Moshahary]
11-Nov-01: Kerala         3–1 Orissa [K: 23 Abdul Naushad, 78,90 Asif Saheer; O: 51 Saroj Das]

Group B

07-Nov-01: Karnataka      0–0 Bengal
09-Nov-01: Tamil Nadu     2–2 Karnataka [T: 8 Sureshkumar, 36 Syed Sabir Pasha; K: 48 Sheikh Sanjeeb, 90 AS Firoze]
11-Nov-01: Tamil Nadu     1–0 Bengal [60 P Muthu]

Group C

08-Nov-01: Maharashtra    3–1 Services [74,77 Narender Meetei, 82 Nitin Shetty; S: 41 Saroj Gurung]
10-Nov-01: Services       0–3 Indian Railways [31,85 Kasif Jamal, 87 Adil Ansari]
12-Nov-01: Maharashtra    1–1 Indian Railways [M: 3 S Venkatesh; I: 6 Manjinder Singh]

Group D

08-Nov-01: Manipur        0–1 Goa [10 Levy Coelho]
10-Nov-01: Manipur        0–4 Punjab [37,56 Ram Pal, 70 Hardip Singh Saini, 82 Gurjit Singh]
12-Nov-01: Punjab         0–1 Goa [51 Jose Colaco]

Semi-finals

Final

Statistics
Leading scorer: 1. Abdul Hakkim (Kerala) – 7 goals, 2. Asif Saheer (Kerala)

List of Awardees:
Fair Play Trophy: Railways & Tamil Nadu

References
http://www.indianfootball.de/seasons/2001-02st.html 

2001–02 in Indian football
2001–02